Kareem Orr (born January 2, 1997) is an American football cornerback who is a free agent. He played college football at Chattanooga.

Professional career

Tennessee Titans
Orr was signed by the Tennessee Titans as an undrafted free agent on May 13, 2019. He was waived on August 31, 2019 and was signed to the practice squad the next day. He was promoted to the active roster on October 26, 2019, but was waived two days later and re-signed back to the practice squad. He was promoted to the active roster again on November 26, 2019. He was waived on December 14, 2019 and re-signed to the practice squad. He signed a reserve/future contract with the Titans on January 20, 2020.

On September 5, 2020, Orr was waived by the Titans and signed to the practice squad the next day. He was elevated to the active roster on October 13 and October 17 for the team's weeks 5 and 6 games against the Buffalo Bills and Houston Texans, and reverted to the practice squad after each game. He was signed to the active roster on October 31. He was placed on injured reserve on November 21, 2020. He was activated on December 12, 2020. On May 6, 2021, Orr was waived by the Titans.

Los Angeles Rams
On May 26, 2021, Orr signed with the Los Angeles Rams. He was waived on August 31, 2021 and re-signed to the practice squad the next day. Orr won Super Bowl LVI when the Rams defeated the Cincinnati Bengals. 

On February 15, 2022, Orr signed a reserve/future contract with the Rams. On April 16, 2022, the Rams waived Orr.

Seattle Sea Dragons 
On November 17, 2022, Orr was drafted by the Seattle Sea Dragons of the XFL.

References

External links
Chattanooga Mocs bio

1997 births
Living people
American football cornerbacks
Sportspeople from Chattanooga, Tennessee
Players of American football from Tennessee
Chattanooga Mocs football players
Tennessee Titans players
Los Angeles Rams players
Seattle Sea Dragons players